The 2012 Ginetta Junior Championship was a multi-event, one make motor racing championship held across England and Scotland. The championship featured a mix of professional motor racing teams and privately funded drivers, aged between 14 and 17, competing in Ginetta G40s that conformed to the technical regulations for the championship. It formed part of the extensive program of support categories built up around the British Touring Car Championship centrepiece.

This season was the sixth Ginetta Junior Championship. The season commenced on 1 April 2012 at Brands Hatch – on the circuit's Indy configuration – and concluded on 21 October 2012 at the same venue, utilising the Grand Prix circuit, after twenty races at ten meetings, all in support of the 2012 British Touring Car Championship.

Regulation changes
The championship included a new two class structure, with a rookie class running alongside the main class. The rookie class was run by Ginetta instead of independent teams and open to any race driver who had not been in the championship before. The £2,800 cost per weekend was intended to encourage young drivers to enter motorsport.

Teams and drivers

Race calendar and results
The 2012 calendar supports the BTCC at all rounds, with no major changes from 2011.

Championship standings

References

External links
 

2012 in British motorsport
2012